Benaiah ("Yahweh builds up") is a common name in the Hebrew Bible.

Etymology 
In the etymology of the name, the first part of Benaiah comes from the root-verb בנה (bana), which is a common Hebrew verb meaning "to build". The second part of Benaiah is יה (Yah), which is not a derivative of the Tetragrammaton, but a contraction of it (ie, the first and last consonants of יהוה are contracted as יה).

Benaiah, son of Jehoiada 
The most famous Benaiah in the Bible is the son of Jehoiada, who came from the southern Judean town of Kabzeel.

Benaiah was one of King David’s mighty men, commander of the 3rd rotational army division;. He helped David's son Solomon become king, killed Solomon's enemies, and served as the chief of Solomon's army. On Solomon's instructions he was responsible for the deaths of Adonijah, Joab and Shimei. He was in charge of the Cherethites and Pelethites. Several verses in  make clear that Benaiah was closely associated with Solomon's party and excluded from Adonijah's faction.

Other Benaiahs 
Other Benaiahs of the Hebrew Bible are:
Another of David's mighty men, an Ephraimite from Pirathon, commander of the 11th rotational army division (1 Chr. 11:31, 1 Chr. 27:14, 2 Sam. 23:30)
 A Levite musician who played his stringed instrument accompanying the Ark of the Covenant when it was brought to Jerusalem and placed in the tent David had prepared for it (1 Chr. 15:18, 20; 16:1, 5).
 A priest who played the trumpet when the Ark was brought to Jerusalem during David's reign (1 Chr. 15:24; 16:6).
 A Levite descendant of Asaph, son of Berachiah the Gershonite (2 Chr. 20:14).
 A Simeonite, possibly a contemporary of King Hezekiah (1 Chr. 4:24, 36–43).
 A Levite appointed by Hezekiah to help care for the bounteous contributions to Jehovah's house (2 Chr. 31:12, 13).
 Father of Pelatiah, one of the wicked princes seen in Ezekiel’s vision (Eze. 11:1, 13).
 Four men who, at Ezra's admonition, dismissed their foreign wives and sons. These four were descendants of Parosh, Pahath-Moab, Bani, and Nebo respectively (Ezr. 10:25, 30, 34, 35, 43, 44).

Footnotes

References
 

 David's Mighty Warriors
 Biblical murderers